Mark Oaten (born 8 March 1964) is a British politician who was a senior member of the Liberal Democrats. He served as the Member of Parliament (MP) for Winchester from 1997 to 2010.

Born in Watford, Hertfordshire, Oaten became a councillor in local government, joining the centre-left Social Democratic Party, which merged with the Liberal Party to form the Liberal Democrats in 1988. He became the party's Home Affairs spokesman in 2003. He stood for the position of Leader of the Liberal Democrats in 2006, but withdrew from the contest he was later hit by a series of scandals which also led to his resignation as Home Affairs spokesman. He did not seek re-election to the House of Commons at the 2010 general election.

Following his retirement from active politics, Oaten published two books, before becoming executive of the International Fur Trade Federation in 2011.

Early life
Oaten was educated at Queens' School, Bushey and the University of Hertfordshire.

Before entering Parliament, Oaten had been a councillor and was employed as a lobbyist by various Westminster public affairs companies. He was leader of the SDP group on Watford Borough Council. He stood for the Watford seat at the 1992 general election and polled 10,231 votes, finishing in third place.

Member of Parliament
Oaten won the Winchester seat in the 1997 election with a majority of two, but his election was later declared void by the Election Court. The defeated Conservative former MP Gerry Malone successfully challenged the election on the basis of an established precedent which voided the result where it had been affected by a decision not to count ballot papers which had not been properly stamped.

This decision caused the 1997 Winchester by-election at which Malone stood again. Oaten won with a majority of 21,556, gaining 68% of the vote. He held the seat in the 2001 election, with a majority of 9,634 (with a 54.6% share of the vote), and again in 2005, although his majority dropped to 7,473 (a 50.6% share of the vote).

Liberal Democrat leadership contest 2006
On 10 January 2006, Oaten declared that he would be a candidate in the leadership election to replace Charles Kennedy, standing on an agenda of making liberalism relevant to the twenty-first century. He was widely rumoured to be Kennedy's favoured successor but his campaign failed to gain momentum. On 18 January, he became embroiled in a row about the leaking of an email.

On 19 January, Oaten withdrew from the contest, having failed to attract support from within the parliamentary party; his sole supporters were Lembit Öpik MP and Sarah Ludford, Baroness Ludford, a peer and MEP. He concluded his withdrawal statement with the words "Next week I'll be giving some thought to where I go politically and giving my thoughts on the future of the Party."

Scandal and resignation
On 21 January 2006, Oaten resigned from the Liberal Democrat front bench when it was revealed by the News of the World that he had hired a 23-year-old male prostitute between the summer of 2004 and February 2005. The newspaper also alleged that Oaten had engaged in 'three-in-a-bed' sex sessions with two male prostitutes. Further allegations surfaced in the media over the following days, including an accusation that he had asked one of the prostitutes to engage in an act of coprophilia.

Oaten gave an explanation for his actions in an essay in The Sunday Times in which he claimed a "mid-life crisis" was partly responsible for his actions. This was partially contradicted by a 2009 Press Gazette interview Oaten gave, in which he said
"Journalists ... had my story for three years I think, but hung on to it and never did anything with it. They could have made that public interest argument at any point in the three years. I had always been a Member of Parliament, but they waited until it could sell most newspapers, at the point at which I became well-known and at my most famous."

Oaten announced that he would be standing down from Parliament at the 2010 general election. The members of his Winchester constituency party selected Martin Tod to replace Oaten as the Liberal Democrat candidate, but Tod was defeated at the general election by the Conservative candidate Steve Brine.

Retirement
After his retirement from frontline politics, Oaten released two books, one on the history of coalition governments, and the other a memoir entitled Screwing Up: How One MP Survived Politics, Scandal and Turning 40. In 2018, he resigned from the Liberal Democrats after being a member for thirty years but announced that he had rejoined them in September 2019 to "help defeat the new extremes growing in politics".

Political leaning
Oaten was a member of the Advisory Board of the Liberal Future think tank until it was wound up in 2005, and one of the contributors to The Orange Book: Reclaiming Liberalism in 2004—although he attracted anger from the book's co-authors at its launch event at the Lib Dem Conference in spring 2004 when he refused to answer questions about his own chapter, stating that it had actually been written by his research assistant, and that he had not even read it. Within the party, Oaten had been called a moderniser in the sense that he was keen to emphasise economic liberalism and to prevent the Liberal Democrats being sidelined as a 'party of the left'. As the party's principal home affairs spokesman, he championed the rights of asylum seekers and civil liberties, condemned calls by then Conservative frontbencher David Davis for the reintroduction of capital punishment and has claimed to want to reunite all the strands of liberalism, and not elevate one above the others.

Tower Block of Commons
In February 2010 Channel 4 broadcast a four-part series called Tower Block of Commons in which four MPs lived with on different council estates in England. Taking part alongside Oaten were Tim Loughton, Austin Mitchell and Nadine Dorries.

International Fur Trade Federation
In 2011 Oaten accepted a position as executive of the International Fur Trade Federation. Whilst an MP, Oaten was critical of any plans to introduce legislation to outlaw fox hunting, and supported a 'middle way' approach to the issue, that would allow hunting to remain legal. In 2004 Oaten voted against the ban on fox hunting.

Personal life
In an interview on BBC Radio 5 Live with Emma Barnett in 2019, Oaten came out as gay and revealed he was in a relationship. He was previously married to his wife, Belinda, with whom he had two daughters.

Notes and references

Publications 
 Coalition: The Politics and Personalities of Coalition Government from 1850, Harriman House Publishing, 2007
 Screwing Up: How One MP Survived Politics, Scandal and Turning 40, Biteback Publishing Ltd, 2009

External links
 
Mark Oaten MP profile at the site of Liberal Democrats
TheyWorkForYou.com - Mark Oaten MP
The Public Whip - Mark Oaten voting record

1964 births
20th-century LGBT people
21st-century LGBT people
21st-century memoirists
Alumni of the University of Hertfordshire
Councillors in Hertfordshire
Gay politicians
LGBT members of the Parliament of the United Kingdom
LGBT memoirists
English LGBT politicians
Liberal Democrats (UK) MPs for English constituencies
Liberal Democrats (UK) councillors
Living people
People educated at Queens' School, Hertfordshire
People from Watford
Politics of Winchester
Social Democratic Party (UK) politicians
UK MPs 1997–2001
UK MPs 2001–2005
UK MPs 2005–2010